Opabin Lake is a body of water located at an elevation of  in the mountains of Yoho National Park, near Field, British Columbia, Canada.

Opabin Lake can be accessed by two climbing trails, the East Opabin trail and the West Opabin trail, which form a 6 km circuit beginning and ending at Lake O'Hara. East Opabin consists of switchbacks through the woods above Lake O'Hara followed by an uphill hike alongside a stream fed by runoff from the snowy peaks. West Opabin involves a somewhat more rugged ascent, where the mossy woods yield to scree, stone steps, and open rocky paths cut into the slopes that offer vistas of Lake O'Hara, Mary Lake, and the surrounding mountains. A third, alpine trail connects the East Opabin trail to nearby Lake Oesa.

Opabin Plateau

Opabin Lake is the major feature on the Opabin Plateau, a hanging valley located above and southeast of Lake O'Hara. The plateau is crossed with trails and streams and dotted with small lakes and ponds. The area is inhabited by whistling hoary marmots, pikas, weasels, ground squirrels, and reclusive wolverines.

References

Yoho National Park
Opabin
Canadian Rockies
Kootenay Land District